Gare de Saintes is a railway station serving the town Saintes, Charente-Maritime department, southwestern France.

Services

The following train services call at the station as of January 2021:
intercity services (Intercités) Nantes - La Rochelle - Bordeaux
regional services (TER Nouvelle-Aquitaine) La Rochelle - Rochefort - Saintes - Bordeaux
regional services (TER Nouvelle-Aquitaine) Royan - Saintes - Angoulême
regional services (TER Nouvelle-Aquitaine) Niort - Saintes - Royan

References

Railway stations in Charente-Maritime
Railway stations in France opened in 1867
Gare